Harry Sands Webber (October 18, 1892 – October 6, 1970) was an American football player.  He played college football for Morningside and professional football in the National Football League (NFL) as and end for the Rock Island Independents. He appeared in four NFL games, two as a starter, during the 1920 and 1923 seasons.

References

1892 births
1970 deaths
Rock Island Independents players
Players of American football from South Dakota